Clifford Bell may refer to:

 Cliff Bell (1896–1952), American pitcher in Negro league baseball
 Clifford Bell (American football) (1880–1936), American football player and coach